Raymond M. 'Ray' Durkin (1936 – December 23, 2014) was an American Democratic party politician from New Jersey who has served as chairman of the New Jersey Democratic State Committee as well as the Essex County Democratic Committee.

Durkin grew up in the Vailsburg neighborhood in the West Ward of Newark, New Jersey. He was a member of the Newark Fire Department for 15 years, before becoming secretary to the county purchasing agent under former Essex County Democratic Chairman Harry Lerner. He became purchasing agent after Peter Shapiro defeated Lerner's organization to become Essex County's first elected executive in 1978. Durkin was an early active supporter of Shapiro.

Durkin was selected as Essex County Democratic Chairman in 1980. In 1985, when Shapiro was the Democratic candidate for Governor of New Jersey opposing incumbent Tom Kean, Durkin was named chairman of the New Jersey Democratic State Committee. Durkin helped Jim Florio win the Democratic nomination for governor in 1989 and also assisted Ron Brown in his election as chairman of the Democratic National Committee that same year.

Durkin served as state party chairman until 1990. He continued as Essex County party chairman until 1992, when he was unseated by County Executive Thomas D'Alessio. (D'Alessio was convicted of extortion in 1994.)

After his loss of the Essex party chairmanship, Durkin dropped out of politics. He spent a month in a rehabilitation program in Minnesota for alcohol abuse. On January 3, 1997 he was arrested outside the Hudson Plaza Motel in Bayonne, New Jersey with one vial of crack cocaine. He was charged with being under the influence, possession of cocaine, and possession of drug paraphernalia. He entered a plea of not guilty but made arrangements to enter a substance abuse program.

Durkin resided in Maplewood, New Jersey. His wife, Joan Codey Durkin, is the cousin of former New Jersey Governor Richard Codey and has served as Essex County Tax Commissioner. His son Christopher J. Durkin has served as Essex County Clerk since 2006. On December 23, 2014, he died clean and sober at the age of 78 from emphysema and heart failure at a hospital in Livingston, New Jersey.

References

1936 births
2014 deaths
New Jersey Democrats
People from Maplewood, New Jersey
Politicians from Newark, New Jersey
Chairmen of the New Jersey Democratic State Committee